Fernando Poe Jr. Memorial Award for Excellence is an annual award made by the Metro Manila Film Festival in honor of actor Fernando Poe Jr. Star Cinema's One More Try was the first recipient, in 2012.

2016 Controversy

For the 42nd Metro Manila Film Festival, Oro, a film directed by Alvin Yapan was awarded as the Fernando Poe Jr. Memorial Award for Excellence recipient on December 29, 2016. Due to issues surrounding the "dog slaughter scene", the family of the late Fernando Poe Jr. decided to revoke the award won by the film.

Special Award winners

References

External links
IMDB: Metro Manila Film Festival
Official website of the Metro Manila Film Festival

Metro Manila Film Festival Awards